In enzymology, a N6-acetyl-beta-lysine transaminase is an enzyme that catalyzes the chemical reaction

6-acetamido-3-aminohexanoate + 2-oxoglutarate  6-acetamido-3-oxohexanoate + L-glutamate

Thus, the two substrates of this enzyme are 6-acetamido-3-aminohexanoate and 2-oxoglutarate, whereas its two products are 6-acetamido-3-oxohexanoate and L-glutamate.

This enzyme belongs to the family of transferases, specifically the transaminases, which transfer nitrogenous groups.  The systematic name of this enzyme class is 6-acetamido-3-aminohexanoate:2-oxoglutarate aminotransferase. This enzyme is also called epsilon-acetyl-beta-lysine aminotransferase.  This enzyme participates in lysine degradation.  It employs one cofactor, pyridoxal phosphate.

References

 

EC 2.6.1
Pyridoxal phosphate enzymes
Enzymes of unknown structure